Marquette University Press is a university press affiliated with Marquette University, located in Milwaukee, Wisconsin. The press was established in 1916 and mostly publishes books that focus on philosophy, theology, and history. The Press was a founding member of the Association of Jesuit University Presses (AJUP).

See also

 List of English-language book publishing companies
 List of university presses

References

External links
Marquette University Press

Press
Association of Jesuit University Presses
University presses of the United States
1916 establishments in Wisconsin
Publishing companies established in 1916